Temnaspis is a genus of beetles in the family Megalopodidae, containing the following species:

 Temnaspis amabilis (Baly, 1878)
 Temnaspis arida Westwood, 1864
 Temnaspis ashlocki Kimoto & Gressitt, 1979
 Temnaspis atrithorax (Pic, 1934)
 Temnaspis bengalensis Westwood, 1864
 Temnaspis bicoloripennis Pic, 1950
 Temnaspis bidentatus Pic, 1922
 Temnaspis bifasciata Mohamedsaid, 1999
 Temnaspis bonneuili Pic, 1947
 Temnaspis brunneipennis Pic, 1926
 Temnaspis centromaculata Medvedev & Sprecher-Uebersax, 1997
 Temnaspis chrysopyga Westwood, 1864
 Temnaspis cumingii Westwood, 1864
 Temnaspis dohrni Jacoby, 1899
 Temnaspis elegans Chujo, 1951
 Temnaspis femorata (Gressitt, 1942)
 Temnaspis flavicornis Jacoby, 1892
 Temnaspis flavonigra (Fairmaire, 1894)
 Temnaspis formosana (Reineck, 1923)
 Temnaspis fraxini (Komiya, 1986)
 Temnaspis humeralis Jacoby, 1890
 Temnaspis insignis Baly, 1859
 Temnaspis japanica Baly, 1873
 Temnaspis javanus (Guérin-Méneville, 1844)
 Temnaspis kuntzeni Reineck, 1913
 Temnaspis kwangtungensis (Gressitt, 1942)
 Temnaspis lugubris Westwood, 1864
 Temnaspis lunduensis Mohamedsaid, 2005
 Temnaspis nankinea (Pic, 1914)
 Temnaspis nigriceps Baly, 1859
 Temnaspis nigricollis Jacoby, 1899
 Temnaspis nigroplagiata Jacoby, 1892
 Temnaspis nigropunctata (Pic, 1896)
 Temnaspis omeiensis (Gressitt, 1942)
 Temnaspis pallida (Gressitt, 1942)
 Temnaspis pua Li & Liang, 2013
 Temnaspis pulcher Baly, 1859
 Temnaspis purpureotinctus Medvedev, 2002
 Temnaspis quadriplagiata Bryant, 1934
 Temnaspis regalis (Achard, 1920)
 Temnaspis rubens (Klug, 1834)
 Temnaspis sanguinicollis Chen & Pu, 1962
 Temnaspis sauteri (Reineck, 1923)
 Temnaspis septemmaculata (Hope, 1831)
 Temnaspis shirakii (Chujo, 1932)
 Temnaspis speciosus Baly, 1859
 Temnaspis squalida Allard, 1892
 Temnaspis syringa Li & Liang, 2013
 Temnaspis testacea (Gressitt & Kimoto, 1961)
 Temnaspis testaceoapicalis Pic, 1955
 Temnaspis vietnamensis Medvedev, 1985
 Temnaspis vitalisi (Pic, 1922)
 Temnaspis westwoodii Baly, 1865

References

Megalopodidae genera
Taxa named by Jean Théodore Lacordaire